This is a list of American films released in 1924.

A

B

C

D

E

F

G

H

I

J

K

L

M

N

O

P

R

S

T

U

V

W

Y–Z

See also 
 1924 in the United States

References

External links 

 1924 films at the Internet Movie Database

1924
Film
Lists of 1924 films by country or language
1920s in American cinema